Beat The Blondes was an unsold pilot for a television game show format based on preconceptions, prejudice, strategy and statistics. The show was created by Eyeworks and was hosted by Tom Arnold. The grand prize was intended to be US $1,000,000.

Rules of the game
The contestant, strictly male, will demonstrate his ability to fly through a series of questions the 50 blonde women ready to flip the stereotype according to which intelligence can not get along with beauty. Man is the center of the study and women before him: 7 rows of 7 women on a scale placed at the top of which is the fiftieth. The game, with a prize money of US$1,000,000, is divided into two heats.

Round 1
In the first round, the competitor challenge a row at a time choosing between the various applications available categories. If answered correctly, the prize increases with the number of women who respond incorrectly. The fiftieth blonde is addressed in a face to face: the wrong answer if she is double the prize so far accumulated, even if the participant responded correctly. The women who gave incorrect answers are eliminated in the first round, correct respondents continue to play in the second.

In the second round of the party will be able to move only if the game remains no more than 25 blondes.

Round 2
In the finale the women are placed in a semicircle in front of the contestant and presenter. At this point the applicant must answer the questions proposed, directly or with multiple choice answers. If the contestant answers correctly, point your finger at a woman believed to have responded incorrectly. If did answered incorrectly she is out of the game and the contestant continues to point the finger until it finds one that has answered correctly, then move to the next question. 10 questions about the competitor may make only three mistakes.

Final round
When there are only three women, the player can decide to stop and take home the prize earned or proceed in an attempt to eliminate them all, thus winning US$1,000,000. If, however, decided to continue then not being able to eliminate the blondes, the last three will share a predetermined fixed amount of $10,000.

International versions

References

External links
Eyeworks website
Greek version
Romanian Version
Ukrainian Version

See also
List of television show franchises

Quiz shows
2000s American game shows
2007 American television series debuts
CBS original programming